Jeremy McGrath Supercross World is a racing video game developed by Acclaim Studios Salt Lake City and published by Acclaim Entertainment under their Acclaim Max Sports label for PlayStation 2 and GameCube.

Reception

The game received "unfavorable" reviews on both platforms according to the review aggregation website Metacritic.

The PlayStation 2 version was nominated for GameSpots 2001 "Worst Game" award among console games, which went to Kabuki Warriors. Its 2002 GameCube version won the site's "Worst Game on GameCube" award the following year.

The Jeremy McGrath franchise has sold nearly two million units worldwide by November 2001.

References

External links

2001 video games
Acclaim Entertainment games
Motorcycle video games
GameCube games
Off-road racing video games
PlayStation 2 games
Video games developed in the United States